NXT TakeOver: Phoenix was the 23rd NXT TakeOver professional wrestling livestreaming event produced by WWE. It was held exclusively for wrestlers from the promotion's NXT brand division. The event aired exclusively on the WWE Network and took place on January 26, 2019, at the Talking Stick Resort Arena in Phoenix, Arizona as part of that year's Royal Rumble weekend.

Five matches were contested at the event. In the main event, Tommaso Ciampa defeated Aleister Black to retain the NXT Championship. In the penultimate match, Shayna Baszler defeated Bianca Belair by technical submission to retain the NXT Women's Championship. Other matches included were Johnny Gargano defeating Ricochet to win the NXT North American Championship, and War Raiders (Hanson and Rowe) defeating The Undisputed Era (Kyle O'Reilly and Roderick Strong) to win the NXT Tag Team Championship in the opening bout.

Production

Background
TakeOver was a series of professional wrestling shows that began in May 2014, as WWE's then-developmental league NXT held their second WWE Network-exclusive event, billed as TakeOver. In subsequent months, the "TakeOver" moniker became the brand used by WWE for all of their NXT live specials. TakeOver: Phoenix was scheduled as the 23rd NXT TakeOver event and was held on January 26, 2019, as a support show for that year's Royal Rumble pay-per-view. It was held at the Talking Stick Resort Arena and was named after the venue's city of Phoenix, Arizona.

Storylines 

The card comprised five matches. The matches resulted from scripted storylines, where wrestlers portrayed heroes, villains, or less distinguishable characters that built tension and culminated in a wrestling match or series of matches. Results were predetermined by WWE's writers on the NXT brand, while storylines were produced on their weekly television program, NXT.

On the July 25, 2018 episode of NXT, Tommaso Ciampa defeated Aleister Black to win the NXT Championship when interference by Johnny Gargano, who was feuding with Ciampa at the time, backfired and instead he cost Black the title. After their interaction, in August, Black was injured by Gargano backstage, preventing him from getting his rematch against Ciampa. Black returned a few months later and on the December 5 episode of NXT, a match between the two was scheduled for TakeOver: Phoenix.

On the December 26, 2018 episode of NXT, after three weeks of qualifying matches, Bianca Belair defeated Io Shirai, Lacey Evans and Mia Yim in a fatal four-way match to become the new number one contender for the NXT Women's Championship.

On the January 9, 2019, episode of NXT, War Raiders attacked The Undisputed Era during EC3's match with Adam Cole. General Manager of NXT, William Regal announced via Twitter that at TakeOver: Phoenix, The Undisputed Era's Kyle O'Reilly and Roderick Strong would defend their NXT Tag Team Championship against The War Raiders.

On the December 19, 2018 episode of NXT, Johnny Gargano defeated Aleister Black in a steel cage match after interference from Tommaso Ciampa. The following week, via a video recording, Ciampa suggested that Gargano go after the NXT North American Championship so he and Gargano could "take over the world" in NXT. On the January 9, 2019 episode of NXT, champion Ricochet told Gargano that he only needed to ask for a title shot, though he questioned if Gargano would ask face-to-face or attack from behind, referencing Gargano's attack on Black. Ciampa came out to further the conflict between Ricochet and Gargano, but was attacked by Black. This confrontation distracted Ricochet, allowing Gargano to give him a superkick, and the match was made official later in the night.

Event

Preliminary matches 
The event opened with The Undisputed Era (Kyle O'Reilly and Roderick Strong) defending the NXT Tag Team Championship against War Raiders (Hanson and Rowe). Hanson and Rowe performed "Fallout" on O'Reilly to win the title.

Next, Matt Riddle faced Kassius Ohno. Riddle forced Ohno to submit whilst executing arm trap elbow strikes to win.

After that, Ricochet defended the NXT North American Championship against Johnny Gargano. Gargano applied the "Garga-No-Escape", but Ricochet escaped. Gargano performed a slingshot DDT on Ricochet for a near-fall. Ricochet applied the "Garga-No-Escape", but Gargano escaped. Gargano performed a brainbuster onto the exposed concrete outside the ring and a second slingshot DDT on Ricochet to win the title.

In the penultimate match, Shayna Baszler defended the NXT Women's Championship against Bianca Belair. Belair attempted a 450° splash, but with the help from Marina Shafir and Jessamyn Duke, Baszler avoided the move and applied the "Kirifuda Clutch". Belair passed out, meaning Baszler retained the title by technical submission.

Main event 
In the main event, Tommaso Ciampa defended the NXT Championship against Aleister Black. Ciampa performed a "Fairytale Ending" on Black for a near-fall. Black performed a "Black Mass" on Ciampa, but Ciampa performed an elevated DDT and a second "Fairytale Ending" on Black for a near-fall. Ciampa performed two more "Fairytale Endings" on Black to retain the title. As the show closed, Ciampa and Johnny Gargano stood at the top of the stage with their respective championships.

Aftermath 
After the event ended on the WWE Network, in a WWE.com exclusive, a confrontation between Aleister Black, Ricochet, Velveteen Dream, Johnny Gargano, Tommaso Ciampa and Adam Cole was quickly broken up by referees and officials, but it continued into the backstage area where they were separated again and Black, Ricochet, and Dream were confronted by Triple H. After everything had settled down, Black, Ricochet and Dream returned to the ring to celebrate. This led to a six man tag-team match 8 days later at Halftime Heat in which Black, Ricochet and Velveteen came out victorious against Cole, Gargano and Ciampa

Results

References

External links
 

Phoenix
2019 WWE Network events
2019 in Arizona
Professional wrestling in Phoenix, Arizona
Events in Phoenix, Arizona
January 2019 events in the United States